Weede is a surname of Dutch origin and may refer to:

People
 Everhard van Weede Dijkvelt (1626–1702), Dutch politician
 Garfield Weede (1880–1971), American sports coach
 Richard G. Weede (1911–1985), American marine
 Robert Weede (1903–1972), American operatic baritone
 Willem Marcus van Weede (1848–1925), Dutch politician

Places
 Weede, Schleswig-Holstein, Germany